Novy Enkheluk (Shene Yonkholog) is a rural locality (a settlement) in Kabansky District, Republic of Buryatia, Russia. The population was 172 as of 2010. There are 12 streets.

Geography 
Novy Enkheluk is located 86 km northeast of Kabansk (the district's administrative centre) by road. Enkhaluk is the nearest rural locality.

References 

Rural localities in Kabansky District
Populated places on Lake Baikal